Louis Veuillot (11 October 1813 – 7 March 1883) was a French journalist, author and anti-Semite who helped to popularize ultramontanism (a philosophy favoring Papal supremacy).

Career overview
Veuillot was born of humble parents in Boynes (Loiret). When he was five years of age, his parents relocated to Paris. With little education, he gained employment in a lawyer's office, and was sent in 1830 to serve with a newspaper of Rouen, and afterwards to Périgueux. He returned to Paris in 1837, and a year later visited Rome during Holy Week. There he embraced ultramontane sentiments, and became an ardent champion of Catholicism. The results of his conversion were published in Pélerinages en Suisse (1839), Rome et Lorette (1841) and other publications.

In 1840, Veuillot joined the staff of the newspaper Univers Religieux, a journal created in 1833 by Abbé Migne, and soon helped make it the leading organ of ultramontane propaganda as L'Univers. His methods of journalism, which made great use of irony and ad hominem criticism, had already provoked more than one duel, and he was imprisoned for a brief time for his polemics against the University of Paris. In 1848, he became editor of the newspaper, which was suppressed in 1860, but revived in 1867, when Veuillot resumed his ultramontane propaganda, causing a second suppression of his journal in 1874. Veuillot then occupied himself by writing polemical pamphlets against liberal Catholics, the Second French Empire and the Italian government. 
His services to the papal see were recognized by Pope Pius IX, on whom he wrote (1878) a monograph. 
Matthew Arnold said of him:

M. Louis Veuillot is a polemic worthy of the golden age of polemics. He is singly devoted to ultramontanism; he lives on a small fixed salary from the proprietors of the Univers; he is a man of the purest and simplest domestic life; he is poor, and has a large family, but he has refused all offers of place and salary from the government, and maintains his entire independence.

And Orestes Brownson wrote:

[Veuillot] manifests the temper and breeding of a fanatic, and seems to act on the principle that whoever differs on any important point in history, politics, or philosophy, from himself, must needs be a bad Catholic, or no Catholic at all. We question not his sincerity, we question not his personal piety; but we do question his qualification to be a Catholic leader. His mind is too narrow and one-sided for that, and his leadership, with the best intentions on his part, is fitted only to bring about the very results he most deprecates. Notwithstanding his hostility to those who regret the loss of parliamentary freedom, and his devotion to Imperialism, he has not been able to save his journal from an avertissement; and it would seem that, after having aided in erecting an Absolute government for his country, and in breaking down all the safeguards established by constitutionalism to freedom of thought, freedom of speech, and public discussion, the police have had the cruelty to take him at his word, and give him a taste of the despotism he has been willing to fasten upon others.

Some of his papers were collected in Mélanges Religieux, Historiques et Littéraires (12 vols., 1857–1875), and his  (7 vols., 1883–85) has great political interest. His younger brother, Eugène Veuillot, published (1901–1904) a comprehensive and valuable life, Louis Veuillot.

Anti-Semitism
Veuillot was a virulent anti-Semite. As early as the 1840s, he wrote articles in L'Univers defaming Jews, portraying them as alien vagabonds, accusing them of blood libel, and asserting that the Talmud commanded Jews to hate all Christians. He contemptuously dismissed Jews who criticized him as "the deicide people", claiming they were a foreign element which plotted to control all of French society. Veuillot's hatred intensified during the Mortara case to the point where it put him at odds with Napoleon III whom he had previously supported, causing the latter to temporarily suppress the journal. Veuillot's two-pronged assault on the Jews and liberalism would influence the anti-Semitism of Édouard Drumont, who worked for L'Univers in his youth.

Works
 Correspondance, Tome II, Tome III, Tome IV, Tome V, Tome VII, Société Générale de Librairie Catholique, 1885.
 Rome et Lorette, J. Casterman, 1841.
 De l'Action des Laiques dans la Question Religieuse, Au Bureau de L'Univers, 1843.
 Vie de Notre-Seigneur Jésus-Christ, Librairie Catholique de Périsse Frérés, 1864 [1st Pub. 1846].
 Les Libres-Penseurs, Jacques Lecoffre et Cie., 1850.
 La Légalité: Dialogue Philosophique, Plon Frères, 1852.
 Les Droits du Seigneur au Moyen Âge, L. Vivés, 1854.
 Le Parti Catholique, L. Vivés, 1856.
 Le Pape et la Diplomatie, Gaume Frères et J. Duprey, 1861.
 Waterloo, Gaume Frères et J. Duprey, 1861.
 Satires, Gaume Frérés et J. Duprey, 1863.
 Le Guêpier Italien, Victor Palmé, 1865.
 A Propos de la Guerre, Palmé, 1866.
 L'Illusion Libérale, Palmé, 1866.
 Les Odeurs de Paris, Palmé, 1867.
 Les Couleuvres, Victor Palmé, 1869.
 Corbin et d'Aubecourt, Victor Palmé, 1869.
 La Liberté du Concile, Victor Palmé, 1870.
 Paris Pendant les Deux Sièges, Victor Palmé, 1871.
 Le Parfum de Rome, Victor Palmé, 1871.
 Mélanges Religieux, Historiques et Littéraires, Tome II, Tome III, Tome IV, Tome V, Tome VI, L. Vivés, 1857–1875.
 Molière et Bourdaloue, Société Générale de Librairie Catholique, 1877.
 La Guerre et l'Homme de Guerre, Victor Palmé, 1878.
 Çá et Lá, Société Générale de Librairie Catholique, 1883.
 Historietes et Fantaisies, Société Générale de Librairie Catholique, 1883.
 Études sur Victor Hugo, Société Générale de Librairie Catholique, 1886.

Works in English translation
 In The Irish Monthly, Vol. 5, 1877.
 "The Graves of a Breton Household," pp. 417–418.
 "The Legend of the Red Lillies," pp. 756–757.
 The Life of Our Lord Jesus Christ. New York: Peter F. Collier, 1878.
 Stephanie. Dublin: M.H. Gill and Son, 1883.
 "The Essence of Giboyer (A Retort to 'Giboyer's Son')." In: The Universal Anthology, Vol. XXVII. London: The Clarke Company, Ltd., 1899.
 In Béla Menczer (Ed.), Catholic Political Thought, 1789-1848, University of Notre Dame Press, 1962.
 "The True Freedom of Thought," pp. 196–205.
 The Liberal Illusion. Kansas City, Mo.: Angelus Press, 2005.

Biography
 Louis Veuillot, French Ultramontane Catholic Journalist and Layman, 1813-1883, Marvin Luther Brown, Moore Publishing Co., 1977.

Gallery

See also
 Charles Forbes René de Montalembert
 Henri, Count of Chambord
 Our Lady of La Salette

Notes

References

Further reading

 Ages, Arnold (1974). "Veuillot and the Talmud," Jewish Quarterly Review 64, pp. 229–260.
 Allison, John M.S. (1916). Church and State in the Reign of Louis Philippe. Princeton University Press.
 Boureau, Alain (1998). "God's Party in the Great Combat." In: The Lord's First Night: The Myth of the Droit de Cuissage. University of Chicago Press.
 Brown, Marvin L. (1977). Louis Veuillot: French Ultramontane, Catholic Journalist and Layman. Durham, N.C.: Moore Publishing Company.
 Cornut, Etienne (1891). Louis Veuillot. Paris: Victor Retaux et Fils.
 Corrigan, Raymond (1938). The Church in the Nineteenth Century. Milwaukee: The Bruce Publishing Company.
 Christophe, Lucien (1967). Louis Veuillot. Paris: Wesmael-Charlier.
 Dimier, Louis (1917). Les Maîtres de la Contre-Révolution au 19e Siècle. Paris: Nouvelle Librairie Nationale.
 Fernessole, Pierre (1923). Les Origines Littéraires de Louis Veuillot, 1813-1843. Paris: J. de Gigord.
 Foucart, Claude (1978). L'Aspect Méconnu d'un Grand Lutteur. Atelier National de Reproduction des Thèses, Université de Lille III.
 Gough, Austin (1996). Paris et Rome. Les Catholiques Français et le Pape au XIXe Siècle. Paris: Éditions de l'Atelier.
 Gurian, Waldemar (1951). "Louis Veuillot," Catholic Historical Review 36, pp. 385–414.
 Isser, Natalie (1979). "The Mortara Affair and Louis Veuillot," Proceedings of the Annual Meeting of the Western Society for French History 7, pp. 69–78.
 Laurioz, Pierre-Yves (2005). Louis Veuillot: Soldat de Dieu. Éd. de Paris, 2005.
 Le Roux, Benoît (1984). Louis Veuillot: Un Homme, un Combat. Paris:  Téqui, 1984.
 MacCaffrey, James (1905). "Louis Veuillot," The Irish Ecclesiastical Record 16, pp. 430–441; Part II, Part III, The Irish Ecclesiastical Record 17, pp. 323–334, 541–555.
 MacCaffrey, James (1910). "The Church in France." In: History of the Catholic Church in the Nineteenth Century. M.H. Gill & Son, pp. 233–251.
 Menczer, Béla (1962). "Louis Veuillot." In: Catholic Political Thought, 1789-1848. University of Notre Dame Press, pp. 192–196.
 Mirecourt, Eugène de (1856). Louis Veuillot. Paris: Gustave Havard. 
 Murray, Eustace Clare Grenville (1873). "M. Louis Veuillot." In: Men of the Third Republic. London: Strahan & Co., pp. 188–201.
 Myers, Rev. E. (1903). "Louis Veuillot," The Catholic World 77, pp. 597–610.
 Neill, Thomas Patrick (1951). "Louis Veuillot." In: They Lived the Faith; Great Lay Leaders of Modern Times. Milwaukee: The Bruce Publishing Company, pp. 299–324.
 Nielsen, Fredrik Kristian (1906). The History of the Papacy in the XIXth Century, Vol. 2. London: John Murray.
 O'Connor, R.F. (1879). "Louis Veuillot," Part II, The Monitor 1, pp. 333–346, 413–428.
 O'Connor, R.F. (1913). "Louis Veuillot," The American Catholic Quarterly Review 38, pp. 612–627.
 Parsons, Reuben (1901). "Louis Veuillot." In: Studies in Church History. New York: F.R. Pustet & Co., pp. 427–440.
 Pierrard, Pierre (1998). Louis Veuillot. Paris: Éditions Beauchesne.
 Preuss, Arthur (1914). "The Veuillot Centenary," The Fortnightly Review 21, pp. 3–4.
 Preuss, Arthur (1902). "A Fighting Editor," Part II, Part III, Part IV, Part V, Part VI, The Review 9, pp. 535–537, 546–548, 564–567, 582–585, 598–601, 616–618.
 Sainte-Beuve, C.A. (1885). "Veuillot as Journalist." In: Causeries du lundi. Oxford: Clarendon Press, pp. 86–90.
 Soltau, Roger Henry (1959). "Veuillot and L'Univers." In: French Political Thought in the 19th Century. New York: Russell & Russell, pp. 176–188.
 Sparrow-Simpson, W.J. (1918). "Louis Veuillot." In: French Catholics in the Nineteenth Century. London: Society for Promoting Christian Knowledge, pp. 107–121.
 Spencer, Philip (1954). Politics of Belief in Nineteenth-Century France: Lacordaire, Michon, Veuillot. London: Faber and Faber.
 Tavernier, Eugène (1913). Louis Veuillot; l'Homme, le Lutteur, l'Écrivain. Paris: Plon.
 Teeling, T.T. (1905). "Louis Veuillot and L'Univers," Part II, The Dolphin 8, pp. 546–558, 693–706.
 Veuillot, Eugène (1904). Louis Veuillot, Tome II, Tome III. Paris: Victor Retaux.

External links

 Catholic Encyclopedia: Louis Veuillot
 Encyclopædia Britannica: Louis Veuillot
 Dr. John C. Rao: Louis Veuillot – Icon and Iconoclast

1813 births
1883 deaths
People from Loiret
French newspaper editors
French Roman Catholics
Roman Catholic conspiracy theorists
Our Lady of La Salette
Burials at Montparnasse Cemetery
19th-century French journalists
French male journalists
French male writers
Antisemitism in France
Late modern Christian antisemitism
French conspiracy theorists